2022 Asian Open Figure Skating Trophy is the 2022 edition of the Asian Open Figure Skating Trophy. Originally planned to be held in Hong Kong, China, it is moved to be held on December 7–11, 2022 in Jakarta, Indonesia due to the COVID-19 pandemic in the host city. As there are not enough pairs and ice dance entries, these disciplines were cancelled, while men, women disciplines will be contested, at senior, junior, advanced novice, intermediate novice and basic novice levels.

Entries

Senior level

Junior level

Advanced Novice

Intermediate Novice

Basic Novice

Results

Senior Men

Senior Women

Junior Men

Junior Women

Advanced Novice Boys

Advanced Novice Girls

Intermediate Novice Boys

Intermediate Novice Girls

Basic Novice Boys

Basic Novice Girls

Medal table

Senior level

Junior level

Novice level

Total

References

Asian Figure Skating Trophy